Borsonia epigona is a species of sea snail, a marine gastropod mollusk in the family Borsoniidae.

Description
This sea snail has a type of shell called a fusiform shell. The size of it can vary, though. The length can vary between 23 mm and 28 mm, and the width can change depending on many things, as most shells are not perfectly sized in some way. The shell of the Borsonia epigona is usually a whitish color, but may vary depending on where you are in the region it is found. The shell is rounded upwards in a spiral, and rough rather that smooth.

Distribution
This marine species occurs off West Sumatra at depths between 614 m and 677 m.

References

  von Martens (1904) Die beschalten Gastropoden der deutschen Tiefsee-Expedition, 1898–1899.. In. A. Systematisch-geographischer Theil., vol. 7 Wissenschaftliche Ergebnisse der deutschen Tiefsee-Expedition auf dem Dampfer "Valdivia" 1898–1899, 1–146 
 A. Sysoev (1997), Mollusca Gastropoda: new deep-water turrid gastropods (Conoidea) from eastern Indonesia

epigona
Gastropods described in 1901